Ella Kapuge Gladwin Wijewardene (born 9 September 1940) is a former Sri Lankan cricket umpire. He stood in one ODI game in 1999.

See also
 List of One Day International cricket umpires

References

1940 births
Living people
Sri Lankan One Day International cricket umpires
People from Colombo